Vancouver Centre is a federal electoral district in British Columbia, Canada, that has been represented in the House of Commons of Canada since 1917. It is the riding with the biggest Japanese community in Canada. As per the 2021 census, 2.4% of the population of Vancouver-Centre is Japanese.

Geography 
The riding includes the neighbourhoods of Yaletown, the West End, Coal Harbour, Downtown Vancouver, western Strathcona, eastern Kitsilano, and False Creek South. The heavily urbanized electoral district is by far the most densely populated in Western Canada, with most of its residents living in mid and high rise apartments. The riding has a diverse, multi-generational demographic.

Demographics
According to the Canada 2021 Census

 Languages (2021 mother tongue) : 55.2% English, 4.8% Mandarin, 4.6% Iranian Persian, 4% Spanish, 2.9% Yue, 2.5% French, 2.5% Korean, 1.9% Russian, 1.8% Portuguese, 1.7% Japanese, 1% German

History
The electoral district was created in 1914 from parts of Vancouver City riding.

Canada's longest-serving female Member of Parliament, Hedy Fry, has represented Vancouver Centre since 1993. Another high-profile MP was Kim Campbell, who served as Prime Minister for 132 days before being defeated by Fry.

The 2012 federal electoral boundaries redistribution concluded that the electoral boundaries of Vancouver Centre should be adjusted, and a modified electoral district of the same name will be contested in future elections. The redefined Vancouver Centre loses a portion of its current territory from its southern end to the new district of Vancouver Granville. These new boundaries were legally defined in the 2013 representation order, which came into effect upon the call of the 42nd Canadian federal election, scheduled for October 2015.

Members of Parliament

This riding has elected the following Members of Parliament:

Current Member of Parliament
Its current Member of Parliament is Hedy Fry, a former physician. She was first elected in 1993, and is a member of the Liberal Party of Canada.

Election results

Student Vote Results

2019

See also
 List of Canadian federal electoral districts
 Past Canadian electoral districts

Notes

References

External links
 Expenditures – 2004
 Expenditures – 2000
 Expenditures – 1997
 Vancouver Centre electoral information at the Library of Parliament
 Website of the Parliament of Canada
 Map of Vancouver Center from Elections Canada. (PDF)
 Vancouver Centre electoral District Profile, Elections Canada
 Conservative Party of Canada - Vancouver Centre Electoral District Association
 Green Party of Canada - Vancouver Centre Electoral District Association

Politics of Vancouver
British Columbia federal electoral districts
Federal electoral districts in Greater Vancouver and the Fraser Valley